Year 1253 (MCCLIII) was a common year starting on Wednesday (link will display the full calendar) of the Julian calendar.

Events 
 By place 
 Europe 
 January 18 – King Henry I (the Fat) dies and is succeeded by his son Hugh II, who is only a few months old. His mother, Queen Plaisance of Antioch, claims the regency of Cyprus and the titular regency of Jerusalem. The High Court of Cyprus confirms her position, but the barons of Outremer require her attendance in person before they will recognize her. John of Ibelin, count of Jaffa, remains as bailli, and Plaisance contemplates marrying John's youthful son Balian. Meanwhile, King Louis IX (the Saint), still staying at Acre, continues to administer the government.
 Summer – The Kingdom of Galicia–Volhynia becomes a vassal state to the expanding Mongol Empire. Prince Daniel of Galicia is crowned "Rex Rusiae" and becomes officially an Orthodox subject of the Papal States.
 July 4 – William II, count of Holland, defeats the Flemish forces under Guy of Dampierre at Westkapelle. He forced him and his mother, Margaret II, to respect the division of Flanders and Hainaut.
 July 6 – Mindaugas and his wife Morta are crowned as king and queen of Lithuania, ruling between 300,000 and 400,000 subjects.
 October 10 – German imperial forces under King Conrad IV suppress the Sicilian rebellion and recapture Naples.

 England 
 August 6 – King Henry III leads an expedition to Gascony, to repel a rumoured invasion from Castile. Meanwhile, Simon de Montfort returns from Gascony where he allies himself with the barons who oppose Henry.
 The Domus Conversorum ("House of the Converts"), a building and institution in London for Jews who had converted to Christianity, is established by Henry III.
 Henry III meets with the nobles and church leaders to reaffirm the validity of Magna Carta in exchange for taxation.

 Levant 
 April – An-Nasir Yusuf, Ayyubid ruler of Damascus, cedes Palestine, together with Jerusalem, Nablus and the coastline of Al-Sham to Aybak, Mamluk sultan of Egypt.

 Asia 
 April 28 – Nichiren, Japanese Buddhist monk, declares his intent to preach the Lotus Sutra and Namu Myōhō Renge Kyō as the true Buddhism, thus founding Nichiren Buddhism.
 May – Louis IX (the Saint) dispatches William of Rubruck from Constantinople, on a missionary journey to Karakorum to seek an alliance against Syrian and Egyptian Muslims.
 Mongol forces under Hulagu Khan begin a campaign against the Nizari Ismaili State. An advance guard (12,000 men) under Kitbuqa captures several fortresses in Quhistan.
 Mongol forces under Kublai Khan conquer the Dali Kingdom (modern-day Yunnan). The population migrates to Siam (modern Thailand).
 Kublai Khan introduces the baisha xiyue song and dance suite to the music of Yunnan.

 By topic 

 Literature 
 Matthew Paris, English Benedictine chronicler, completes the major part of his Chronica Majora, a chronicle of English history.

 Religion 
 October – Pope Innocent IV returns to Rome, after being deposed for 9 years by former Emperor Frederick II, whose clash forms an important chapter in the conflict between the Papal States and the Holy Roman Empire. 
 Innocent IV offers the crown of Sicily, which he controls, to Richard of Cornwall and Charles of Anjou, both of whom refuse, and later to the 8-year-old Edmund, son of Henry III.
 The upper Basilica of Saint Francis of Assisi, the earliest important structure of Italian Gothic architecture, is completed in Assisi.
 Sligo Abbey, a Dominican monastery,  is founded by Maurice FitzGerald, Norman chief governor of Ireland.

Births 
 March 1 – Mattia de Nazarei, Italian abbess and saint (d. 1319)
 September 11 – Dmitry Borisovich, Kievan nobleman (d. 1294)
 October 17 – Ivo of Kermartin, Breton priest and saint (d. 1303)
 November 25 – Katherine of England, English princess (d. 1257)
 Amir Khusrau, Indian Sufi musician, poet and scholar (d. 1325)
 Anna of Greater Poland, Polish princess and abbess (d. 1295)
 Berengaria of Castile, Spanish princess and regent (d. 1300)
 Blanche of France, daughter of Louis IX (the Saint) (d. 1323)
 Eschiva of Ibelin, Outremer noblewoman and regent (d. 1312)
 Eufemia of Greater Poland, Polish princess and nun (d. 1298)
 Everhardt I, count of Limburg and Hohenlimburg (d. 1308)
 Hugh II (de Lusignan), Cypriot ruler and regent (d. 1267)
 John II (the One-Eyed), count of Holstein-Kiel (d. 1321)
 Nikō, Japanese Buddhist monk and disciple (d. 1314)

Deaths 
 January 1 – Marino Morosini, doge of Venice (b. 1181)
 January 18 – Henry I (the Fat), king of Cyprus (b. 1217)
 April 3 – Richard of Chichester, English bishop (b. 1197)
 April 5 – Wilbrand von Käfernburg, German archbishop
 April 22 – Elias of Cortona, Italian friar and vicar general
 June 11 – Amadeus IV, Italian nobleman and knight (b. 1197)
 June 12 – Boniface II (the Giant), king of Thessalonica (b. 1201)
 July 8 – Theobald I, French nobleman and trouvère (b. 1201)
 July 22 – Albert IV, German nobleman and knight (b. 1180)
 August 11 – Clare of Assisi, Italian nun and saint (b. 1194)
 September 22 – Dōgen, Japanese Buddhist priest (b. 1200)
 September 23 – Wenceslaus I, king of Bohemia (b. 1205)
 October 9 – Robert Grosseteste, English bishop (b. 1168)
 October 22 – William de Vesci, English nobleman (b. 1205)
 November 16 – Agnes of Assisi, Italian abbess and saint 
 November 21 – Christian II, German archbishop (b. 1185)
 November 29 – Otto II, German count palatine (b. 1206)
 Ahmad al-Tifashi, Almohad poet and anthologist (b. 1184)

References